Radical 192 or radical sacrifical wine meaning "sacrifical wine" is one of the 8 Kangxi radicals (214 radicals in total) composed of 10 strokes.

In the Kangxi Dictionary, there are eight characters (out of 49,035) to be found under this radical.

 is not listed as a Simplified Chinese indexing component in the Table of Indexing Chinese Character Components

Evolution

Derived characters

Literature

External links

Unihan Database - U+9B2F

192